Majuri is a surname. Notable people with the surname include:

Raimo Majuri (born 1943), Finnish skier
Susanna Majuri (1978–2020), Finnish fine art photographer
Tauno Majuri (1907–1980), Finnish stage and film actor